The Giblin Peak is a mountain of the Ben Lomond mountain range in northeast Tasmania, Australia. It is the highest elevation on Giblin Fells, a prominent bluff south of Ben Lomond's highest elevation - Legges Tor.

Before the northern aspect of the Ben Lomond plateau was surveyed, Stacks Bluff (at the plateau's southern extremity) was thought to be the highest elevation on the Ben Lomond plateau.  From  1905 to 1912 a full survey of Ben Lomond was conducted by Colonel W.V. Legge and his survey party.   
The survey party explored the highlands on the north of the plateau in 1907.  Legge had long suspected that the north of the plateau was higher than the trigonometric station on Stacks Bluff although it is less obviously elevated from casual observation.  Moreover, the area was, at the time, an area so remote and unexplored that Legge described it as 'untrodden as the distant ranges of the west coast'.
Lyndhurst Giblin, a member of Legge's survey party,  climbed and measured the true summit and named it after Legge and, in turn, the prominent bluff to the south of the summit was named for Giblin's father - Giblin Fells.

See also

 List of highest mountains of Tasmania

References

External links
 Parks Tasmania

Mountains of Tasmania
North East Tasmania